Ion therapy may refer to:
Negative air ionization therapy, the use of air ionisers as an experimental non-pharmaceutical treatment
Particle therapy a medical radiotherapy (excluding neutron therapy)